Metković is a city in the Dubrovnik-Neretva County of Croatia.

Metković may also refer to:

 RK Metković (Rukometni Klub Metković) is a handball club from Metković, Croatia. 
 Metković (Bogatić), a village in Serbia
Mačvanski Metković
Pocerski Metković

See also
Matković, a Serbo-Croatian surname